

A08A Antiobesity preparations, excluding diet products

A08AA Centrally acting antiobesity products
A08AA01 Phentermine
A08AA02 Fenfluramine
A08AA03 Amfepramone
A08AA04 Dexfenfluramine
A08AA05 Mazindol
A08AA06 Etilamfetamine
A08AA07 Cathine
A08AA08 Clobenzorex
A08AA09 Mefenorex
A08AA10 Sibutramine
A08AA11 Lorcaserin
A08AA12 Setmelanotide
A08AA51 Phentermine and topiramate
A08AA56 Ephedrine, combinations
A08AA62 Bupropion and naltrexone

A08AB Peripherally acting antiobesity products
A08AB01 Orlistat
QA08AB90 Mitratapide
QA08AB91 Dirlotapide

A08AX Other antiobesity drugs
A08AX01 Rimonabant

See also
Diet products are in the ATC group V06A.

References

A08